Halyna Andreyeva (born 1985) is a beauty pageant titleholder from Odessa; she won the title of Miss Ukraine Earth 2007 and competed in Miss Earth 2007 pageant in Manila, Philippines.  She was also the 2nd runner up and winner of the "People's Choice" award at the 2007 Miss Ukraine pageant.

References

1985 births
Miss Earth 2007 contestants
Models from Odesa
Living people
Ukrainian beauty pageant winners